This page lists public opinion polls conducted for the 2017 French legislative elections, which were held in two rounds on 11 and 18 June 2017.

Unless otherwise noted, all polls listed below are compliant with the regulations of the national polling commission (Commission nationale des sondages) and utilize the quota method.

Graphical summary 
The averages in the graphs below were constructed using polls listed below conducted by the nine major French pollsters. The graphs are smoothed 14-day weighted moving averages, using only the most recent poll conducted by any given pollster within that range (each poll weighted based on recency).

No total for Europe Ecology – The Greens (EELV) was provided by the Ministry of the Interior in the 2017 legislative elections. According to statistics compiled by Laurent de Boissieu, 454 EELV candidates collected 3.41% of the vote in the first round.

First round 
The comparison for the French Communist Party and La France Insoumise with 2012 is made against the Left Front. Before their unification under the umbrella of the Union of Democrats and Independents, the New Centre, Radical Party, and Centrist Alliance were counted individually in 2012, and are included in the miscellaneous right total for that year, which would otherwise be 3.51%.

Second round seat projections 
Projections marked with an asterisk (*) were constructed for 535 out of 577 constituencies, including only metropolitan France only and excluding Corsica as well as overseas territories and residents.

The comparison for the French Communist Party and La France Insoumise with 2012 is made against the Left Front. Before their unification under the umbrella of the Union of Democrats and Independents, the New Centre, Radical Party, and Centrist Alliance were counted individually in 2012, and are included in the miscellaneous right total for that year, which would otherwise be 15.

By second round configuration

By first round vote 
In each case, results were based on interviews in which respondents were presented with a list of candidates in their constituency.

LREM/MoDem–LR/UDI/DVD

PS/FI/DVG–LREM/MoDem

LREM/MoDem–FN

By constituency

First round

Bouches-du-Rhône's 4th

Charente-Maritime's 1st

Eure's 1st

Gard's 2nd

Gironde's 2nd

Landes's 1st

Pas-de-Calais's 11th

Pyrénées-Atlantiques's 4th

Rhône's 6th

Paris's 2nd

Essonne's 1st

Hauts-de-Seine's 9th 
The campaign of Marie-Laure Godin commissioned and released a PollingVox survey in this constituency, after which the campaign of Thierry Solère published an Ifop poll contradicting its findings.

Second round

Bouches-du-Rhône's 4th

Charente-Maritime's 1st

Eure's 1st

Gard's 2nd

Landes's 3rd

Pyrénées-Atlantiques's 4th

Rhône's 6th

Paris's 2nd

Essonne's 1st

Hauts-de-Seine's 9th 
The campaign of Marie-Laure Godin commissioned and released a PollingVox survey in this constituency, after which the campaign of Thierry Solère published an Ifop poll contradicting its findings.

Pre-2017 polling

First round 
Before their unification under the umbrella of the Union of Democrats and Independents, the New Centre, Radical Party, and Centrist Alliance were counted individually in 2012, and are included in the miscellaneous right total for that year, which would otherwise be 3.51%. The total for miscellaneous candidates in 2012 also includes regionalist, ecologist, and far-right candidates who were not counted separately in the CSA poll, and would otherwise be 0.52%.

Second round seat projections 
Before their unification under the umbrella of the Union of Democrats and Independents, the New Centre, Radical Party, and Centrist Alliance were counted individually in 2012, and are included in the miscellaneous right total for that year, which would otherwise be 15. The total for miscellaneous candidates in 2012 also includes regionalist and far-right candidates who were not counted separately in the CSA poll, and would otherwise be 0.

See also 
Opinion polling for the French presidential election, 2017
Opinion polling for the French legislative election, 2012
Opinion polling for the French legislative election, 2007

References

External links 
Notices of the French polling commission 

Opinion polling in France
France